Brookvale may refer to the following places:
Brookvale, New South Wales
Brookvale, Nova Scotia